Kiyoshi Nobutoki (信時 潔, 29 December 1887 – 1 August 1965) was a Japanese composer, teacher and cellist.

Career
His pupils included Kan'ichi Shimofusa, Kunihiko Hashimoto, Saburō Takata, Midori Hosokawa (細川碧), Yoshio Hasegawa (長谷川良夫), Taijiro Goh (呉泰次郎), Megumi Ohnaka (大中恩), and Toshio Kashiwagi (柏木俊夫).

Works, editions and recordings
"Umi Yukaba" (海行かば) 1937 - patriotic song (gunka) based on a waka poem by Ōtomo no Yakamochi in the Man'yōshū.
 Song cycle Sara (沙羅) - recording by Kazumichi Ohno (tenor), Kyosuke Kobayashi (piano). Thorofon CD. 1994
 String Quartet (1922)
 Cantata "Kaido-tosei (Along the Coast, Conquer the East)", text by Hakushū Kitahara, based on Nihon Shoki (1940)

Awards and honours
Translated from the Japanese Wikipedia article
Member of the Japan Academy of Art (1942)
Asahi Prize (1943)
Person of Cultural Merit (1963)
Order of the Rising Sun, Gold Rays with Neck Ribbon, Third Class (1964)

References

1887 births
1965 deaths
20th-century classical composers
20th-century Japanese composers
20th-century Japanese male musicians
Concert band composers
Japanese classical cellists
Japanese classical composers
Japanese male classical composers
Japanese music educators
Japanese Romantic composers
Musicians from Osaka
19th-century male musicians
20th-century cellists